The Deluge is the fifth album released by the American 
heavy metal band Manilla Road. It was originally issued in 1986 and re-released in 2001.

Track listing
All songs written by Mark 'the Shark' Shelton, except "Morbid Tabernacle" written and performed by Mike Metz..
 "Dementia" - 3:09
 "Shadow in the Black" - 5:22
 "Divine Victim" - 3:09
 "Hammer of the Witches" - 2:41
 "Morbid Tabernacle" - 1:53
 "Isle of the Dead" - 2:53
 "Taken by Storm" - 3:19
 "The Deluge" - 8:13
 "Friction in Mass" - 6:27
 "Rest in Pieces" - 1:51

 Re-release has a live version of "Dementia" as the eleventh track.

Credits
Band 
  Mark Shelton - lead vocals, 6- and 12-string guitars
 Scott Park - bass
 Randy Foxe - drums and percussion, backing vocals, synthesizer

Production
Max Merhoff - producer, engineer
Manilla Road - producer, arrangements
Jay Merhoff, Rick Fisher and Sherry Avett - producers
Larry Funk - engineer 
Eric Larnoy - illustration,  concept

References

Manilla Road albums
1986 albums